Acropteroxys gracilis, the slender lizard beetle, is a species of lizard beetle in the family Erotylidae. It is found in Central America and North America, including into Canada.

With a body length range of 6-12mm, it is narrower and shorter than its relative, A. lecontei, the only other currently described species within this genus. 

It is reported to feed upon ambrosia plant species such as the common ragweed. Members of this plant genus are serious agricultural pests and so this insect species has been investigated for potential use as a biocontrol agent. However, A. gracilis is considered an economic pest due to its activity boring into the stems of Trifolium pratense (red clover), Medicago sativa (alfalfa) and Melilotus spp. (sweet clover) as well as a number of other plants in the Asteraceae, Poaceae and Urticaceae families.

References

Further reading

External links

 

Erotylidae
Articles created by Qbugbot
Beetles described in 1838